The Bravone (or Bravona) is a small coastal river in the department of Haute-Corse, Corsica, France.

Course

It crosses the communes of Alzi, Bustanico, Campi, Linguizzetta, Matra, Mazzola, Moïta, Pianello, Tallone, Tox and Zalana.

The Bravona rises to the northeast of the  Punta di Caldane.
In its upper reaches it flows west, then south, then east, then turns to the southeast past the village of Pianello.
From here it flows in a generally southeast direction before flowing east to its mouth on the sea just north of Marine de Bravone.
Through most of its course there is no major road beside the river.

Valley

As of 2021 the Bravone valley did not attract many tourists, even in the high season.
It is accessible via the D16 and D116 roads.
The D16 leads through the villages of Tox, Campi, Moïta and Matra on the northeast side of the valley.
About  after Matra there is a lookout point from which a 20-minute hike along a trail leads down to the magnificent Genoese bridge of Aliso.
A five-minute walk upstream of the bridge along the river leads to the Bravone waterfall, set in an ancient forest, which falls into a large, deep basin.
On the southwest side villages include Poggio, the charming hamlet of Pianelluccio and Ampriani, a hilltop village.

Water quality

In the 1980s there were plans to build a rockfill dam on the Bravone.
It would have covered  and contained  of water for use in irrigating  of land in the eastern plain of Corsica.
However, it was found that the river's waters were significantly contaminated by arsenic and antimony, so the project was abandoned.
The contamination was due to intensive exploitation of an arsenic mine at the start of the 20th century on the banks of the Presa tributary near the village of Matra.
Although levels of contamination drop further downstream, even at its mouth it is three times higher than is allowed by French and European regulations.
The fish in the river are not safe to eat.

Hydrology

Measurements of the river flow were taken at the Tallone [Moulin de Granagiu] station from 1961 to 1999.

Tributaries
The following streams (ruisseaux) are tributaries of the Bravone (ordered by length) and sub-tributaries:

 Vadone 
 Zecche 
 Presa 
 Sonnente 
 Valle Sottana 
 la Fontaine 
 Vignole 
 Tofo 
 Siala 
 Pelaben 
 Sambuchetto 
 Péri 
 Prunellacce 
 Canale 
 Padulone 
 Meta 
 Sorbo 
 Acqua d'Orso 
 Dicceppo 
 Scandolajo 
 Nespoli 
 Marignani 
 Suaracce 
 Lupinaghio 
 Suario 
 Piedalitravi 
 Roticelle 
 Struscia 
 Sambuchello 
 Forciali 
 Pediventulella 
 Casaninchi 
 Costadi 
 Linareccia 
 Piedivolgare 
 Tavolajo 
 San Michèle 
 Audimerza 
 Filicaggio 
 Casette 
 Quencione 
 Mana

Notes

Sources

Rivers of Haute-Corse
Rivers of France
Coastal basins of the Tyrrhenian Sea in Corsica